The men's 800 metre freestyle competition of the swimming events at the 2012 European Aquatics Championships took place May 24 and 25. The heats took place on May 24, the final on May 25.

Records
Prior to the competition, the existing world, European and championship records were as follows.

Results

Heats
21 swimmers participated in 3 heats.

Final
The final was held at 17:02.

References

Men's 800 m freestyle
European Aquatics Championships